Stolen Heaven may refer to:

 Stolen Heaven (1931 film), an American Pre-Code drama film 
 Stolen Heaven (1938 film), an American drama film
 Stolen Heaven (1974 film), an Italian-German drama film